Catharina Amalia Dorothea von Schlegel (22 October 1697 - after 1768 ) was a German hymn writer.

Although little is known about her life, it is known that she lived in a Lutheran Damenstift (a residential endowment for unmarried Protestant women). This Damenstift was in Cöthen in the Principality of Anhalt. In 1726 she corresponded with August Hermann Francke, the Lutheran clergyman, philanthropist, and Biblical scholar. In 1768 von Schlegel was probably still alive.

She wrote a number of hymns in the spirit of early Pietism that can be found in the various collections of Cöthen'schen Lieder. Amongst English speakers, von Schlegel's best known hymn is "Stille mein Wille, dein Jesus hilft siegen" (written in 1752). It was the translated into English by Jane Laurie Borthwick as Be still, my soul, the Lord is on thy side and is usually sung to the tune of Finlandia.

External links
Indelible Grace Music - Katharina Amalia Dorothea von Schlegel

1697 births
German Lutheran hymnwriters
Women hymnwriters
Year of death unknown